Crank Halt was a railway station serving the village of Crank, Merseyside, England on the St Helens to Rainford Junction then Ormskirk line.

History
The station was named Crank railway station from its opening for passengers on 1 February 1858 until 9 September 1940 when it was renamed Crank Halt.
 
The station was operated by the St Helens Railway, LNWR, the London Midland and Scottish Railway from 1923 and finally British Railways (London Midland Region) until it closed in 1951 for scheduled passenger services.  However, the line remained open for goods services and for passenger excursions and diversions up until 1964.

Location and facilities

The station was located at the foot of the hill up to the village just east of the level crossing with the minor road from St Helens to Crank which later became the B5201. It had distinctive wooden buildings on each platform with curved overhanging roofs to provide protection from inclement weather. Some other stations on the line had buildings of the same pattern.

Services

In July 1922 thirteen "Up" (southbound) trains called at the station on weekdays, with an extra on Saturday evenings. All originated at Ormskirk, several with connections from Southport. Ten Up trains called on Sundays. All trains continued all stations to St Helens. The "Down" (northbound) service was similar.

The trains all consisted of "Motor Cars – One class only". 'Motor Cars' then did not have their modern meaning, but consisted of a single railway coach joined to a dedicated steam locomotive. Their generic type is summarised in L&YR railmotors. Photographs appear in Bob Pixton's work on the line.

In 1951 the Up service consisted of five trains on weekdays with three extra on Saturdays, all stations to St Helens. The rolling stock was "Third Class Only". No trains called on Sundays. The Down service was similar.

All local trains plying between Ormskirk and St Helens called at Rainford Junction, entailing a reverse. None used the 'direct line' between Bushey Lane Junction and Randle Junction which formed the third side of the triangle shown near the top of the route diagram. That stretch was the preserve of goods trains, diversions and occasional specials.

Private sidings

Crank Colliery had its own private siding which left the line immediately south of the halt. The colliery company was wound up on 30 January 1880 and the colliery was dismantled. No trace can be seen in the 6" OS Map surveyed in 1892.

References

Sources

External links
 A detailed history Disused Stations UK
 The station on an 1888-1913 Overlay OS Map National Library of Scotland
 The station on an old O.S. Map npemaps
 The station and line overlain on many maps Rail Map Online

Disused railway stations in St Helens, Merseyside
Former London and North Western Railway stations
Railway stations in Great Britain opened in 1858
Railway stations in Great Britain closed in 1951
Rainford